Marghtumayn ( or Махтамайн Makhtamayn, Yaghnobi Марғтумайн) is a village in Sughd Region, northwestern Tajikistan. It is part of the jamoat Anzob in the Ayni District, and located east of the village Anzob. Its population was 12 in 2007.

References
 Сайфиддин Мирзозода: Фарҳанги яғнобӣ-тоҷикӣ. Душанбе (Анҷумани Деваштич) 2008.

Populated places in Sughd Region
Yaghnob